is a Japanese voice actor. He is affiliated with Across Entertainment.

Filmography

Television animation

Film animation

Original net animation
A.I.C.O. -Incarnation- (2018), Kazuki Minase

Video games
Super Bomberman R (Red Bomberman)
Grimms Notes (Katze)
Yakuza: Like A Dragon (young Masumi Arakawa)

Dubbing
Cymbeline (Cloten (Anton Yelchin))
Step Up: All In (Robert "Moose" Alexander III (Adam G. Sevani))

References

External links

1982 births
Japanese male voice actors
Male voice actors from Kōchi Prefecture
Living people
21st-century Japanese male actors
Across Entertainment voice actors